The 2014 La Tropicale Amissa Bongo took place from 13–19 January 2014, and was the ninth edition of La Tropicale Amissa Bongo. This edition of the race consisted of seven stages.

Participating teams
Fourteen teams competed in the 2014 La Tropicale Amissa Bongo; six professional teams took part along with eight national selection teams.

The 14 teams invited to the race were:

Stages

Stage 1
13 January 2014 — Bitam to Ebolowa (Cameroon),

Stage 2
14 January 2014 — Awoua to Oyem,

Stage 3
15 January 2014 — Ndjolé to Lambaréné,

Stage 4
16 January 2014 — Lambaréné to Mouila,

Stage 5
17 January 2014 — Lambaréné to Kango,

Stage 6
18 January 2014 — Port-Gentil to Port-Gentil,

Stage 7
19 January 2014 — Owendo to Libreville,

References

External links

La Tropicale Amissa Bongo
La Tropicale Amissa Bongo
La Tropicale Amissa Bongo
La Tropicale Amissa Bongo
La Tropicale Amissa Bongo